Turkeyfoot Valley Area Junior/Senior High School is one of two schools that are in the same building, which make up the Turkeyfoot Valley Area School District. The campus is located two miles south of Confluence on State Route 523 in the Lower Turkeyfoot Township community of Harnedsville.

History
Students moved into for the building in the fall of 1955, and it was dedicated in 1956 under Supervising Principal Howard Trexel. It was constructed of concrete, brick and steel and cost $658,584.22 to construct. The high school, along with the elementary annex was renovated in 1996.

Vocational education
Students in grades 10-12 who wish to pursue training in a specific career path or field may attend the Somerset County Technology Center in Somerset Township.

Athletics and extracurricular activities

Athletics
The school participates in the Pennsylvania Interscholastic Athletic Association District V for Pennsylvania-related athletic activity. The school joined the Blue and Grey Football Conference in the 1980s, competing with schools of their size in Maryland and West Virginia.

Pennsylvania Interscholastic Athletic Association-sanctioned sports are as follows:

Notable Championships
Turkeyfoot has the following championships  under their belt in their 60+ year history:
 Somerset County Football Champions: 1972, 1984
 Somerset County Softball Champions: 1979, 1980
 Somerset County Boys Basketball Champions: 1983-84, 1988–89
 Pennsylvania Interscholastic Athletic Association District V Boys Basketball Champions: 1983-84

Extracurricular Clubs
The following clubs are available to students:
 Band
 Campus ministries
 Future Farmers of America
 Journalism
 National Honor Society
 S.A.D.D. 
 Student Council
 Webpage

References

Schools in Somerset County, Pennsylvania
Public high schools in Pennsylvania
Public middle schools in Pennsylvania
1950 establishments in Pennsylvania
Educational institutions established in 1950